Summer Girl is the sixth studio album by American rock band Smash Mouth, released on September 19, 2006 through Beautiful Bomb Records. This is the last album featuring original guitarist and songwriter Greg Camp.

The album was released with the promo single "Story of My Life". The "Story of My Life" music video was filmed in an episode in Season 6 of the VH1 reality show The Surreal Life.

"So Insane" was featured as the opening theme to the 2006 film Zoom. An instrumental version of "So Insane" was also used in the opening of the infamous ABC series Cavemen, in its unaired pilot. "Everyday Superhero" was used on the soundtrack of The Pacifier and Zoom. It was used to advertise the CBS sitcom, The King of Queens, when the show entered its final season. It was also heard in an America's Funniest Home Videos blooper compilation.

Track listing

Credits

Smash Mouth
Steve Harwell – lead vocals
Greg Camp – guitars, backing vocals
Paul De Lisle – bass, backing vocals
Michael Klooster – keyboards, melodica (track 7)
Michael Urbano – drums (tracks 1, 2, 5, 6, 8, 9, 10, 11)
Jason Sutter – drums (tracks 3, 4, 7)

Additional musicians
RV – keyboards (tracks 1, 5)
Mark Cervantes – percussion (track 4)
Moushumi Motor Wilson – backing vocals (track 5)
Leslie Lala Damage Stevens – backing vocals (track 5)

Production
Michael Urbano – producer (tracks 1, 2, 5, 8, 9, 10, 11)
Jeff Saltzman – producer (tracks 1, 5, 8, 9, 10, 11)
Greg Camp – producer (tracks 3, 4, 7)
Eric Valentine – producer (track 3, 6, 7); lead vocals producer (track 10); drums producer (track 4)
Paul De Lisle – producer (track 4)
Matthew Gerrard – lead vocals producer (tracks 2, 6)
Michael Perfitt – additional production (track 2)
Chris Bellman – mastering (at Bernie Grundman Mastering)
Kelly Castro – art direction, photography, design

Engineers
Eric Valentine – producer, mixing, engineer
Marco Martin – engineer
Michael Perfitt – producer, engineer, mixing
Mikael Johnston – assistant engineer
Steve Beacham – assistant engineer
Chris Roach – assistant engineer, engineer
Chris Dugan – mixer

References

Smash Mouth albums
2006 albums
Self-released albums